Carlos Daniel Franco (born 24 May 1965) is a Paraguayan professional golfer who currently plays on the PGA Tour Champions. He is the brother of golfer Ángel Franco.

Franco was born in Asunción, Paraguay. He comes from a poor background and grew up in a one-room, dirt-floor home. His father was a greenkeeper and caddie, and he has five brothers, all of whom became golf professionals. Carlos turned professional in 1986 and has played in many parts of the world. He has won more than twenty tournaments in Latin America, and from 1994 to 1999 he won five times on the Japan Golf Tour. He also won the 1994 Philippine Open title on the Asia Golf Circuit and claimed the Order of Merit title that season. He first played on the U.S.-based PGA Tour in 1999 and was fully exempt until 2006. He was the first rookie to surpass $1 million in earnings in a season and won the PGA Tour Rookie of the Year title. He won four times on the PGA Tour. He has featured in the top 20 of the Official World Golf Rankings, going as high as 16th in 2000. He is also one of the few non-Americans to win a Presidents Cup as a member of the 1998 team.

After struggling to stay on the PGA Tour, Franco also played on the Web.com Tour and PGA Tour Latinoamérica. Franco joined the Champions Tour after turning 50.

At the 2019 Pan American Games, Franco teamed with Fabrizio Zanotti, Julieta Granada, and Sofia García, to win the silver medal in the mixed team event.

Professional wins (25)

PGA Tour wins (4)

PGA Tour playoff record (1–0)

Japan Golf Tour wins (5)

Japan Golf Tour playoff record (0–1)

Asia Golf Circuit wins (1)

Other wins (13)
1985 Chile Open
1986 Chaco Open (Argentina)
1987 Asunción Open (Paraguay)
1990 Norpatagonico Open (Argentina)
1991 Daytron Cup (Paraguay)
1992 Paraguay Open
1993 Los Leones Open (Chile), Uruguay Open, Asunción Open (Paraguay)
2000 Paraguay Open
2001 Brazil Open
2003 Brazil Open
2004 Center Open (Argentina)

PGA Tour Champions wins (2)

Results in major championships

WD = Withdrew
CUT = missed the halfway cut
"T" indicates a tie for a place.

Summary

Most consecutive cuts made – 4 (1998 Open Championship – 1999 U.S. Open)
Longest streak of top-10s – 1 (twice)

Results in The Players Championship

CUT = missed the halfway cut
"T" indicates a tie for a place.

Results in World Golf Championships

1Cancelled due to 9/11

QF, R16, R32, R64 = Round in which player lost in match play
"T" = Tied
NT = No tournament

Results in senior major championships
Results are not in chronological order before 2022.

CUT = missed the halfway cut
"T" indicates a tie for a place
NT = No tournament due to COVID-19 pandemic

Team appearances
Alfred Dunhill Cup (representing Paraguay): 1991, 1993, 1994, 1999
World Cup (representing Paraguay): 1992, 2000, 2001, 2003, 2005, 2007
Presidents Cup (International Team): 1998 (winners), 2000

See also
1998 PGA Tour Qualifying School graduates
2007 PGA Tour Qualifying School graduates

References

External links

The Carlos Franco Country And Golf Club's official site

Paraguayan male golfers
PGA Tour golfers
Japan Golf Tour golfers
PGA Tour Champions golfers
Pan American Games medalists in golf
Pan American Games silver medalists for Paraguay
Golfers at the 2019 Pan American Games
Medalists at the 2019 Pan American Games
Sportspeople from Asunción
1965 births
Living people